Hahnville is a census-designated place (CDP) in and the parish seat of St. Charles Parish, Louisiana, United States. The population was 2,792 at the 2000 census and 2,959 in 2020. For information on the origin of Hahnville, see Michael Hahn (1830–1886).

Geography
Hahnville is located at  (29.967081, -90.410129).

History
In the second half of the 19th century, the village of Hahnville was established by Michael Hahn, 19th Governor of Louisiana, near his plantation in St. Charles Parish where he had been living since his retirement in 1872.

Demographics 

As of the 2020 United States census, there were 2,959 people, 1,354 households, and 897 families residing in the CDP.

Education
St. Charles Parish Public School System operates public schools:
Hahnville High School in Boutte, on the west bank of the Mississippi River.

Notable people
LaRon Byrd – NFL wide receiver
Jack Carey, jazz trombonist
Mutt Carey – jazz trumpeter
Michael Hahn – 19th-century state judge, governor and U.S. representative
Mary Ann Vial Lemmon – U.S. federal judge
Herb Simpson, Negro league and minor league baseball player
Stacy Johnson, Singer and human rights activist

References

Census-designated places in Louisiana
Census-designated places in St. Charles Parish, Louisiana
Parish seats in Louisiana
Census-designated places in New Orleans metropolitan area
Louisiana populated places on the Mississippi River